Ranger is a surname; people with that name include:

Andrew Ranger, Canadian racing driver
Henry Ward Ranger, American artist
Ivan Ranger, Croatian baroque painter
Mick Ranger, English arms dealer
Nile Ranger, English footballer who plays for Football League One club Southend United
Paul Ranger, Canadian professional ice hockey defenceman
Rene Ranger, New Zealand rugby union player
Richard H. Ranger, American electrical engineer and inventor
Rose Ranger, Canadian singer-songwriter
Scott Ranger, Canadian lacrosse player
Terence Ranger, African historian
Joshua.H.Ranger, Canadian Artist

See also
Ranger (disambiguation)

Occupational surnames
English-language occupational surnames